Meu Pé de Laranja Lima is a 1968 novel by José Mauro de Vasconcelos.

Meu Pé de Laranja Lima may also refer to:
 Meu Pé de Laranja Lima (film), the 1970 film adaptation of the nove
 Meu Pé de Laranja Lima, also known as My Sweet Orange Tree, the 2012 film adaptation of the novel
 Meu Pé de Laranja Lima (TV series), the 1998 telenovela adaptation of the novel
 O Meu Pé de Laranja Lima (1970 TV series), a telenovela adaptation of the novel
 O Meu Pé de Laranja Lima (1980 TV series), a telenovela adaptation of the novel